Rifugio Sanremo is a refuge in the Ligurian Alps in Italy. Located at 2,054 m, is the highest mountain hut in Liguria.

History 
Rifugio Sanremo was built in 1950 and enlarged in 1984 with an upper floor containing a 30-bed dorm. It was dedicated in 2012 to Agostino Gauzzi (nicknamed "Tino"), an Italian alpinist who was among the founders of the Sanremo branch of Club Alpino Italiano.

Access 
The hut can be reached from La Brigue, France, and from Briga Alta and Montegrosso Pian Latte, Italy.
It is located on the Alta Via dei Monti Liguri.

See also 

 Monte Saccarello
 Monte Frontè
 Cima Garlenda

References

External links
 

Mountain huts in Italy
Province of Imperia
Mountain huts in the Alps